Michael Simmons Student Activity Center is the current home of Indiana State University Trike and Tandem Races in Terre Haute, Indiana, USA. Constructed in 2005 by MSI Construction, INC. of Clinton Indiana to seat approximately 2,500 people, the facility's  primary use is the home of Homecoming tradition of trike and the spring week tradition of Tandem. The stadium was officially dedicated on October 21, 2005. The stadium and its grounds also are used for intramural softball and football.

References

External links
http://www2.indstate.edu/recsport/TrikeTandem.htm
http://visions.indstate.edu:8888/cdm/ref/collection/isupub/id/38
http://www.isustudentmedia.com/indiana_statesman/life_and_culture/people/greek_life/article_376f286e-5087-11e4-b354-0017a43b2370.html

Indiana State University
Buildings and structures in Terre Haute, Indiana
Sports venues in Indiana